The Military Region 5 Commandos, MR 5 Commandos or MR 5 Cdos for short, were an elite military unit and Special Operations force of the Royal Lao Armed Forces (commonly known by its French acronym FAR), which operated during the final phase of the Laotian Civil War from 1969 to 1975.

Origins
In 1969 some 300 selected Laotian personnel from the Royal Lao Army (RLA) were sent to Thailand to attend advanced Airborne and Ranger courses manned by instructors from the Royal Thai Army Special Forces (RTSF) at their Special Warfare Centre and Recondo School co-located at Fort Narai in Lopburi Province.  Upon returning to Laos after completing their training, they went to provide the core of a new Para-Commando battalion which was assigned to Military Region 5, hence became known as "Military Region 5 Commandos".

Structure and organization 
By January 1970, MR 5 Cdos strength peaked at 340 officers and enlisted men, all airborne-qualified volunteers, organized into a battalion comprising one headquarters (HQ), three company HQ sections, and three Commando companies. The unit was based in Ban Y Lai, north of Vientiane, Laos capital city.

Operational history 1969-1975

The MR 5 Cdos were initially employed primarily on counter-insurgency sweeps targeting Pathet Lao guerrilla units around Vientiane, though in later years they were deployed in other military regions to demonstrate symbolic support from the Royal Lao Government.  During September 1971 one company participated in Operation Golden Mountain, the successful capture of Phou Khout Mountain, overlooking Muang Soui in Military Region 2 (Long Tieng), and in 1972 two companies were sent to Military Region 4 (Pakse) to assist RLA units in the recapture of Khong Sedone. As late as May 1975, after the collapse of the FAR, a single remaining company from the MR 5 Cdos was fighting Pathet Lao forces north of the Laotian capital city.

See also
 Air America (airline)
 Commando Raider Teams
 Directorate of National Coordination
 Laotian Civil War
 Lao People's Armed Forces
 Pathet Lao
 Royal Lao Armed Forces
 Royal Lao Army Airborne
 Special Guerrilla Units (SGU)
 SPECOM
 Vietnam War
 Weapons of the Laotian Civil War

Endnotes

References
Kenneth Conboy and Simon McCouaig, South-East Asian Special Forces, Elite series 33, Osprey Publishing Ltd, London 1991. 
Kenneth Conboy with James Morrison, Shadow War: The CIA's Secret War in Laos, Boulder CO: Paladin Press, 1995. , 1581605358

Further reading
Kenneth Conboy and Don Greer, War in Laos 1954-1975, Carrollton, TX: Squadron/Signal Publications, 1994. 
Kenneth Conboy and Simon McCouaig, The War in Laos 1960-75, Men-at-arms series 217, Osprey Publishing Ltd, London 1989. 
Khambang Sibounheuang (edited by Edward Y. Hall), White Dragon Two: A Royal Laotian Commando's Escape from Laos, Spartanburg, SC: Honoribus Press, 2002. 

Military units and formations of Laos
Military units and formations established in 1969
Special Forces of Laos
Military units and formations disestablished in 1975
1975 disestablishments